Keyup (also Romanized as Keyūp and Kayūp; also known as Kayūb) is a village in Mongasht Rural District, in the Central District of Bagh-e Malek County, Khuzestan Province, Iran. At the 2006 census, its population was 458, in 82 families.

References 

Populated places in Bagh-e Malek County